Sve što vidim je prvi put (Everything I See Is For The First Time) is the debut album by the Serbian alternative rock band Repetitor released by the Odličan Hrčak independent record label in 2008.

Track listing 
All music written by Repetitor, all lyrics written by Boris Vlastelica.

Personnel 
Repetitor
 Boris Vlastelica — guitar, vocals
 Ana-Marija Cupin — bass, vocals
 Milena Milutinović — drums

Additional personnel
 Katarina Šoškić — artwork by [design] 
 Boris Mladenović — recorded by
 Goran Crevar — recorded by
 Ivo Lorencin — recorded by

Legacy 
The lyrics of the songs "Ja" ("I") and "Pukotine" ("Cracks") were featured in Petar Janjatović's book Pesme bratstva, detinjstva & potomstva: Antologija ex YU rok poezije 1967 - 2007 (Songs of Brotherhood, Childhood & Offspring: Anthology of Ex YU Rock Poetry 1967 - 2007), Repetitor being the youngest act whose lyrics are featured in the book.

References

External links
 Album review at Popboks
 Sve što vidim je prvi put at Discogs

2008 albums
Repetitor albums